Sharpe's Waterloo is a British television drama, the 14th part of a series that follows the career of Richard Sharpe, a fictional British soldier during the Napoleonic Wars. The adaptation is based on the 1990 novel of the same name by Bernard Cornwell.

Plot

In 1815, war breaks out once more as Napoleon returns to France from exile on Elba. Richard Sharpe (Sean Bean) cannot resist the chance to finally see his enemy and breaks his promise to his French lover Lucille (Cécile Paoli) to fight no more. However, unlike his adulterous wife Jane (Abigail Cruttenden), she forgives him and accompanies him to the battlefield, where he finds employment as a lieutenant colonel on the staff of Prince William of Orange (Paul Bettany) and makes the acquaintance of his aide de camp Colonel Rebecque (Oliver Tobias).

Sharpe then scouts far south of Quatre Bras. He spots French troops and sends a Dutch cavalryman on patrol to alert the Allied command. However, the cavalryman and his patrol are attacked and killed by French cuirassiers (who were pursuing Sharpe).

Meanwhile, Lord Rossendale (Alexis Denisof) has joined the staff of Lord Uxbridge (Neil Dickson), Wellington's second-in-command, and has brought his lover, Sharpe's estranged wife Jane, with him to Brussels, but they find that not only will polite society refuse to accept or even acknowledge Jane but also that Sharpe is also in Brussels and close by.

Sharpe then returns to the Prince of Orange's camp. There, he is reunited with his former sergeant major and best friend, Patrick Harper (Daragh O'Malley), and two of his long-time "chosen men": Hagman (John Tams) and Harris (Jason Salkey).

Sharpe scouts the French forces, while a contingent of Dutch musketeers holds a French column off. He then alerts the Duke of Wellington (Hugh Fraser) at a ball in Brussels that Napoleon is on the move. As Sharpe is leaving, he runs into Jane and Rossendale; he chases Rossendale and challenges him in front of the guests. When Rossendale shows his cowardice by refusing to fight (and wetting himself in the face of Sharpe's rage), Sharpe extracts a promise that he will get back the money Jane stole from him. Previously, Jane had persuaded Rossendale that he must kill her husband during the coming battle.

Sharpe is sent to command the defence of a crucial farmhouse at La Haye Sainte, which is defended by the King's German Legion and the 95th Rifles. He saves a King's German Legion officer, Macduff. Believing that La Haye Sainte has fallen, Prince William orders an English regiment to reform from square to line and re-capture the farm. However, French cavalry are nearby and, with the British in exactly the wrong formation, destroy the unit and capture its colours, while Sharpe watches in disgust.

As the battle rages, both Lucille and Jane wait for news; Lucille praying for Sharpe's safe return and Jane writing in her diary that she is pregnant with Rossendale's bastard child. Sharpe re-encounters Rossendale on the field; Rossendale draws a pistol on Sharpe, but does not have the courage to fire as Sharpe calmly rides up to him. Sharpe takes both Rossendale's sword and pistol and breaks them. He makes Rossendale write the required promissory note for Sharpe's money (which is actually worthless, since Jane has the money and Rossendale has no money of his own) and then tells Rossendale that he can have Jane since he has just bought her.

That night, Rossendale invents a story for his fellow officers to explain the destruction of his sword and pistol, but later confesses the truth to Witherspoon. Witherspoon tells him the only way for Rossendale to regain his lost honor is to fight like a demon in the coming battle.

Sharpe witnesses more instances of the absolute military incompetence of Prince William. The last time, it costs the lives of Harris and Hagman while the Prince gallops away to save his own skin, leaving his men to be slaughtered by the French. Furious, Sharpe shoots the prince at long range from a secluded spot, but only succeeds in wounding him (the real William of Orange was also wounded at the Battle of Waterloo). Meanwhile, on another part of the battlefield, Rossendale fights French cuirassiers, but is ultimately killed.

Sharpe then rejoins his old unit, the Prince of Wales' Own Volunteers, taking over when its commanding officer, Lieutenant Colonel Ford, becomes a casualty. At the crucial point of the Battle of Waterloo, Napoleon sends in his elite Imperial Guard. Sharpe repels the last-ditch assault, much to Wellington's delight. As the Prussians finally arrived, Wellington gives Sharpe command of the regiment and tells him to pursue the retreating enemy. Whilst advancing, Sharpe glimpses Napoleon as he rides off in defeat.

Cast
 Sean Bean as Lieutenant-Colonel Richard Sharpe
 Daragh O'Malley as Mr. Patrick Harper
 Abigail Cruttenden as Jane Sharpe
 Alexis Denisof as Lord John Rossendale
 Cécile Paoli as Lucille Castineau
 Hugh Fraser as Lord Wellington
 Paul Bettany as Prince William of Orange
 Oliver Tobias as Colonel Rebecque
 Neil Dickson as Lord Uxbridge
 Nicholas Irons as Harry Price
 Martin Cochrane as Macduff
 Jason Salkey as Rifleman Harris
 John Tams as Rifleman Daniel Hagman
 Martin Glyn Murray as Doggett
 Owen Brenman as Witherspoon
 Shaughan Seymour as Lieutenant-Colonel Ford
 Jane Merrow as Duchess of Richmond
 Chloe Newsome as Paulette
 Janek Lesniak as Dutch Captain

Production
The programme was shot in Turkey.

External links
 
 Sharpe's Waterloo at SharpeFilm.com

1997 British television episodes
1990s historical films
1990s war films
Works about the Battle of Waterloo
Films based on British novels
Films based on historical novels
Films based on military novels
Films set in 1815
Napoleonic Wars films
Waterloo
War television films
Cultural depictions of Arthur Wellesley, 1st Duke of Wellington
Cultural depictions of Napoleon
Films directed by Tom Clegg (director)